Jordan Young may refer to:

Jordan Young (footballer) (born 1999), Scottish footballer for Gloucester City
Jordan Young (producer), American television producer and writer
Jordan Young (fighter), American MMA fighter
DJ Swivel (born 1984), Canadian disc jockey

See also

Young (surname)